Edme is a Thames barge which was built in 1898 for the Horlocks of Mistley. She was registered in Harwich. She is one of two barge sailing today that have no auxiliary engine.

Description

History
She was built of wood at Harwich in 1898 by Cann for F.W.Horlock. The United Kingdom Official Number 105425 was allocated. She sailed commercially until 1939 carrying malt and acid. During the 1939-1945 she served in Harwich Harbour as an anchor point for barrage balloons. In 1946 she was derigged and used as a timber lighter in Heybridge Basin. She then became a houseboat.

From 1971 there was a lengthy restoration by Ian Danskin at Maldon, Essex before she was bought by the Harman-Harrison Consortium, taken to St Osyth in 1992 and rerigged as bowsprit barge. She is now owned by EDME Consortium, and based at St Osyth. In 2013 she obtained a grant towards the cost of replacing a chine. Along with the SB Mirosa she still has no engine.

She is racing in 2017 in the Thames and Medway sailing barge matches. She is notable for her shallow draught.

See also

List of active Thames sailing barges

References

Further reading

External links

 Thames Sailing Barge Trust
 Mersea museum barge database
 Sailing Barge Association
 Society for Sailing Barge Research active barges

Edme
1898 ships
Individual sailing vessels
Ships built in Harwich
Transport on the River Thames
Sailing ships of the United Kingdom
Ships and vessels on the National Register of Historic Vessels